Geoffrey IV may refer to:

Geoffrey IV, Viscount of Châteaudun (died 1176)
Geoffrey IV, Count of Anjou (died 1106)
Geoffrey IV of Joinville (died 1190), crusader
Geoffrey IV of La Tour Landry (fl. 1330–1402), knight and author on chivalry